Wheeler Springs is an unincorporated community that grew around a set of sulphurated hot springs in Ventura County, California.
It is located 6 miles north of the Ojai Valley, within Los Padres National Forest. It is named for Wheeler Blumberg, who founded the town in 1891, and the many natural hot springs.

Wheeler Springs is most known for its former resort, natural hot springs and for previously being home to the smallest post office in the U.S. It is also where TV personality Art Linkletter opened the theme park Kiddyland Park. Wheeler Springs is home to numerous campgrounds, including Wheeler Gorge Campground by Matilija Creek, as well as multiple hiking trails and open-space nature areas.

Etymology
Wheeler Springs is named for Wheeler C. Blumberg, who acquired government land surrounding the hot springs. Blumberg discovered the hot springs here in 1890 when he was out on a hunting trip. He shot a deer which fell into a ravine. When Blumberg climbed into the canyon, he discovered hot sulphur springs and cold mountain water springs.

History

The first people to inhabit Wheeler Springs was the Chumash. Wheeler Springs was home to a Chumash village - known as Sisxulkuy - during the Mission period. It is often assumed that hot springs in Wheeler Springs were sacred to the Chumash people, although there are no archeological evidence to confirm this.

Resort
The Wheeler′s Hot Springs resort is located in Wheeler Springs. The resort operated throughout the 1900s, but closed in 1997. It offered fishing, hunting, swimming, camping, trail riding and dancing and was often visited by Johnny Cash during the 1960s, when Cash resided in nearby Casitas Springs. The founder of the resort, Wheeler Blumberg, established the resort in 1891. It had 14 rental cabins, a swimming pool, bar, and more. In May, 1907, Blumberg locked himself in a room and began shooting through the walls. Blumberg was arrested by a posse and placed in a straitjacket and a padded cell in Ventura. He died the following day at age 43. Webb Wilcox, Blumberg's son-in-law, became the new owner and renamed it Wheeler Hot Springs.

Post office
Wheeler Springs Post Office was established by Webb Wilcox next door to Webb Wilcox Cafe in the mid-1930s. The shack, no larger than a phone booth, was designated by Ripley's Believe it or Not as the smallest post office in America. It was opened after the completion of the Maricopa Highway, which connected the Ojai Valley to the town of Maricopa in Kern County. The community lost its post office status in 1962. The post office was located at 16850 Maricopa Highway. It burned down in December 2017 during the Thomas Fire.

Geography

Wheeler Springs is located 5.5 miles north of the Ojai Valley and is situated within Los Padres National Forest. It is located next to Maricopa Highway. Tall mountain peaks, including Nordhoff Ridge, border the village in all directions. It is a mountain community which sits along the North Fork of Matilija Creek. During rainy winters, a waterfall near the highway splashes down into the creek. Creekbeds which cross the highway may contain deep water, making crossing difficult.

The community is situated north of the Topatopa Mountains, east of the Santa Ynez Mountains, and south of the San Rafael Mountains. There are natural mineral water springs, both hot and cold. The hot springs have a temperature of 102° Fahrenheit.

Wheeler Springs is in a rugged, mountainous landscape surrounded by giant oak trees. It is located 100 miles from Los Angeles, 19 miles north of Ventura and 7 miles north of Ojai. California State Route 33 (Maricopa Highway) passes through the village.

Geology
Wheeler Springs is located in a narrow, deeply incised canyon known as Wheeler Gorge, which is eroded by the North Fork of Matilija Creek and cuts through the Santa Ynez-Topatopa Range in northern Ventura County. The canyon is so narrow that three tunnels and an additional three bridges had to be constructed for Maricopa Highway to be built. The North Fork of Matilija Creek joins the main river (Matilija Creek) just south of Wheeler Springs in nearby Ojala, California. From Ojala it drains southward via the Ventura River to the coast.

Recreation
Wheeler Springs is home to Wheeler Gorge Campground and a variety of hiking trails in the Los Padres National Forest.

Hiking Trails
 Wheeler Gorge Nature Trail: A 0.75-mile loop was built by the Youth Conservation Corps in 1979. The trail follows the North Fork of the Matilija Creek.
 North Matilija Trail: A 2.6-mile roundtrip loop to nearby Matilija Campground. It ascends the Upper North Fork of Marilija Creek and passes through four nearby campgrounds: Marilija, Middle Marilija, Upper Marilija and Maple.

References

Reference bibliography 

Unincorporated communities in Ventura County, California
Ojai, California
Unincorporated communities in California